Oswald Probst (9 July 1935 – 15 July 2015) was an Austrian archer. He competed in the men's individual event at the 1976 Summer Olympics.

References

1935 births
2015 deaths
Austrian male archers
Olympic archers of Austria
Archers at the 1976 Summer Olympics
Sportspeople from Vienna
20th-century Austrian people